Tân Phú Tây is a rural commune of Mỏ Cày Bắc District, Bến Tre Province, Vietnam. The commune covers 10.2 km2. In 1999 it had a population of 7,262 and a population density of 712 inhabitants/km2.

References

 

Communes of Bến Tre province
Populated places in Bến Tre province